Burraq is a village in southern Syria, located in the Daraa Governorate and in the Al-Sanamayn District. Its other names are Bouraq, Bourâq, Burāq, Bouraa, Al Burak, Burak, Buraq, Burrāq, Bourak. It is located at an altitude of 650 meters.

References

External links
  Map of town, Google Maps
 Mesmiye-map; 19M

Populated places in Al-Sanamayn District